North Brunswick is a township in Middlesex County, in the U.S. state of New Jersey. It is centrally located in the Raritan Valley region within the New York metropolitan area. As of the 2020 United States census, the township's population was 43,905, an increase of 3,163 (+7.8%) from the 2010 census count of 40,742, which in turn reflected an increase of 3,455 (+12.3%) from the 36,287 counted in the 2000 census.

North Brunswick is located south of New Brunswick. It was named named for its earlier-established neighbor, South Brunswick. Brunswick comes from New Brunswick, which was named after the German city of Braunschweig, formerly translated in English as Brunswick or for the British royal House of Brunswick. North and South Brunswick, in turn, became the namesakes for East Brunswick. Alternatively, the city gets its name from King George II of Great Britain, the Duke of Brunswick-Lüneburg.

History
The area that would become North Brunswick had been settled by the Lenape Native Americans. European settlers from France and The Netherlands acquired land in 1772 from the Lenape that would become North Brunswick.

North Brunswick was first mentioned in Middlesex Freeholder Board minutes of February 28, 1779. North Brunswick Township was incorporated on February 21, 1798, by the New Jersey Legislature's Township Act of 1798 as one of the state's initial group of 104 townships. Portions of the township have since separated to create East Brunswick (February 28, 1860) and Milltown (January 29, 1889). Territorial exchanges were made with Franklin Township, Somerset County, New Jersey in 1850 and 1858, with South Brunswick in 1856 and with New Brunswick in 1860, 1917 and 1929.

Geography
According to the U.S. Census Bureau, the township had a total area of 12.31 square miles (31.88 km2), including 12.03 square miles (31.16 km2) of land and 0.28 square miles (0.71 km2) of water (2.24%).

Unincorporated communities, localities and place names located partially or completely within the township include Adams, Berdines Corner, Black Horse, Bodines Corner, Franklin Park, Georges Road, Livingston Park, Maple Meade, Patricks Corner and Red Lion. The northern portion of the township, near the New Brunswick border, is mainly middle class while the southern and eastern sections tend to be more affluent, with a few homes priced around $1 million.

The township borders the municipalities of East Brunswick, Milltown, New Brunswick and South Brunswick in Middlesex County; and Franklin Township in Somerset County.

Like many other New Jersey communities, North Brunswick is faced with the issues of suburban sprawl and open space preservation. The  Otken Farm property on Route 130 between Adams Lane and Renaissance Boulevard was purchased by the township to be converted into North Brunswick Community Park, which opened in April 2007. The nearby Pulda Farm, on Route 130 at Wood Avenue, however may be developed into an age-restricted community pending legal challenge. Re-development of the site of the former Johnson & Johnson pharmaceutical plant on U.S. Route 1 between Adams Lane and Aaron Road is currently the subject of a public hearing process that will determine what may be built on the property. There is also discussion of building an NJ Transit commuter railroad station on the site, along the Northeast Corridor Line. Other parcels slated for development into retail shopping centers include the currently wooded corner of Route 130 and Adams Lane diagonally across from the Maple Meade Plaza.

North Brunswick is part of the watershed of the Lawrence Brook, a tributary of the Raritan River. The brook's watershed covers  that also includes East Brunswick, Milltown, New Brunswick and South Brunswick.

Demographics

2010 census

The Census Bureau's 2006–2010 American Community Survey showed that (in 2010 inflation-adjusted dollars) median household income was $78,469 (with a margin of error of +/− $3,515) and the median family income was $91,053 (+/− $3,268). Males had a median income of $60,285 (+/− $3,591) versus $50,018 (+/− $2,499) for females. The per capita income for the township was $32,944 (+/− $1,441). About 4.5% of families and 6.8% of the population were below the poverty line, including 7.2% of those under age 18 and 5.3% of those age 65 or over.

2000 census
At the 2000 United States census there were 36,287 people, 13,635 households and 9,367 families residing in the township. The population density was 3,018.3 per square mile (1,165.6/km2). There were 13,932 housing units at an average density of 1,158.8 per square mile (447.5/km2). The racial makeup of the township was 62.73% White, 15.27% African American, 0.17% Native American, 14.20% Asian, 0.03% Pacific Islander, 4.70% from other races, and 2.89% from two or more races. Hispanic or Latino of any race were 10.40% of the population.

There were 13,635 households, of which 33.3% had children under the age of 18 living with them, 53.4% were married couples living together, 11.6% had a female householder with no husband present, and 31.3% were non-families. 24.5% of all households were made up of individuals, and 7.5% had someone living alone who was 65 years of age or older.  The average household size was 2.58 and the average family size was 3.12.

23.0% of the population were under the age of 18, 8.0% from 18 to 24, 36.5% from 25 to 44, 22.5% from 45 to 64, and 10.0% who were 65 years of age or older. The median age was 35 years. For every 100 females, there were 98.7 males. For every 100 females age 18 and over, there were 95.3 males.

The median household income in the township was $61,325, and the median income for a family was $70,812. Males had a median income of $48,961 versus $35,971 for females. The per capita income for the township was $28,431.  4.7% of the population and 2.7% of families were below the poverty line.  4.7% of the population and 2.7% of families were below the poverty line. Of the total people living in poverty, 4.0% were under the age of 18 and 8.5% were 65 or older.

In addition to the township's residents, an average daily population of 1,182 inmates are housed at the Middlesex County Adult Correctional Center, located on Route 130 at Apple Orchard Lane.

Government

Local government
North Brunswick is governed using the Faulkner Act's Mayor-Council-Administrator form of local government in New Jersey. The township is one of three of 564 municipalities in the state governed under this form. It was formed as a result of a Charter Study in 1982. One of the variations available under the Faulkner Act, the Mayor is directly elected by the voters and serves a term of four years, while the Township Council is comprised of six Council Members elected at-large to three-year terms of office on a staggered basis, with two council seats up for election each year. The primary responsibilities of the Council are to serve as the legislative body of the township, approve the annual budget presented by the Mayor, approve payment of bills and serve as liaisons to boards and committees.

, the Mayor of North Brunswick is Francis "Mac" Womack III, whose term of office ends December 31, 2023. The Township Council is comprised of Council President Robert Davis (D, 2023), Ralph Andrews (D, 2022), Amanda Guadagnino (D, 2022), William Lopez (D, 2024), Rajesh Mehta (D, 2023; elected to serve an unexpired term) and Cologero "Carlo" Socio (D, 2024).

In April 2021, the Township Council selected Rajesh Mehta from a group of candidates submitted by the Democratic municipal committee to fill the seat expiring in December 2023 that had been held by Claribel Cortes until she stepped down from office the previous month when she was sworn into office as Middlesex County Surrogate.

In April 2020, the Township Council selected Claribel Cortes from a list of three candidates nominated by the Democratic municipal committee to fill the seat expiring in December 2020 that became vacant following the death of Robert Corbin.

Former mayors include Paul Matacera, who served for more than 16 years, and David Spaulding, the township's first Republican mayor in more than 25 years.

Federal, state, and county representation
North Brunswick is located in the 12th Congressional District and is part of New Jersey's 17th state legislative district.

 

Middlesex County is governed by a Board of County Commissioners, whose seven members are elected at-large on a partisan basis to serve three-year terms of office on a staggered basis, with either two or three seats coming up for election each year as part of the November general election. At an annual reorganization meeting held in January, the board selects from among its members a commissioner director and deputy director. , Middlesex County's Commissioners (with party affiliation, term-end year, and residence listed in parentheses) are 
Commissioner Director Ronald G. Rios (D, Carteret, term as commissioner ends December 31, 2024; term as commissioner director ends 2022),
Commissioner Deputy Director Shanti Narra (D, North Brunswick, term as commissioner ends 2024; term as deputy director ends 2022),
Claribel A. "Clary" Azcona-Barber (D, New Brunswick, 2022),
Charles Kenny (D, Woodbridge Township, 2022), Leslie Koppel (D, Monroe Township, 2023),
Chanelle Scott McCullum (D, Piscataway, 2024), and Charles E. Tomaro (D, Edison, 2023).
Constitutional officers are County Clerk Nancy Pinkin (D, 2025, East Brunswick),
Sheriff Mildred S. Scott (D, 2022, Piscataway), and Surrogate Claribel Cortes (D, 2026; North Brunswick).

Politics
As of March 2011, there were a total of 22,079 registered voters in North Brunswick Township, of which 8,302 (37.6%) were registered as Democrats, 2,410 (10.9%) were registered as Republicans and 11,352 (51.4%) were registered as Unaffiliated. There were 15 voters registered as Libertarians or Greens.

In the 2012 presidential election, Democrat Barack Obama received 68.4% of the vote (10,367 cast), ahead of Republican Mitt Romney with 30.4% (4,605 votes), and other candidates with 1.2% (175 votes), among the 15,264 ballots cast by the township's 23,172 registered voters (117 ballots were spoiled), for a turnout of 65.9%. In the 2008 presidential election, Democrat Barack Obama received 65.0% of the vote (10,290 cast), ahead of Republican John McCain with 33.3% (5,270 votes) and other candidates with 1.0% (156 votes), among the 15,837 ballots cast by the township's 22,580 registered voters, for a turnout of 70.1%. In the 2004 presidential election, Democrat John Kerry received 58.4% of the vote (8,180 ballots cast), outpolling Republican George W. Bush with 40.3% (5,643 votes) and other candidates with 0.6% (125 votes), among the 14,010 ballots cast by the township's 20,477 registered voters, for a turnout percentage of 68.4.

In the 2013 gubernatorial election, Republican Chris Christie received 54.6% of the vote (4,326 cast), ahead of Democrat Barbara Buono with 44.1% (3,496 votes), and other candidates with 1.2% (99 votes), among the 8,034 ballots cast by the township's 23,385 registered voters (113 ballots were spoiled), for a turnout of 34.4%. In the 2009 gubernatorial election, Democrat Jon Corzine received 48.3% of the vote (4,482 ballots cast), ahead of Republican Chris Christie with 43.7% (4,056 votes), Independent Chris Daggett with 5.9% (547 votes) and other candidates with 1.0% (95 votes), among the 9,279 ballots cast by the township's 21,714 registered voters, yielding a 42.7% turnout.

Education
The North Brunswick Township Public Schools serve students in pre-kindergarten through twelfth grade. As of the 2019–20 school year, the district, comprised of six schools, had an enrollment of 6,096 students and 530.0 classroom teachers (on an FTE basis), for a student–teacher ratio of 11.5:1. Schools in the district (with 2019–20 enrollment data from the National Center for Education Statistics) are 
North Brunswick Township Early Childhood Center with NA students in Pre-K, 
John Adams Elementary School with 565 students in grades K–4, Arthur M. Judd Elementary School with 786 students in grades Pre-K–4, Livingston Park Elementary School with 594 students in grades K–4, Parsons Elementary School with 703 students in grades K–4, 
Linwood School with 1,356 students in grades 5–6, North Brunswick Township Middle School with NA students in grades 7–8, and North Brunswick Township High School with 1,886 students in grades 9–12.

John Adams School was recognized in 1998–1999 as a National Blue Ribbon Award School of Excellence. The district's high school was recognized in 1999–2000.

Eighth grade students from all of Middlesex County are eligible to apply to attend the high school programs offered by the Middlesex County Vocational and Technical Schools, a county-wide vocational school district that offers full-time career and technical education at Middlesex County Academy in Edison, the Academy for Allied Health and Biomedical Sciences in Woodbridge Township and at its East Brunswick, Perth Amboy and Piscataway technical high schools, with no tuition charged to students for attendance.

Portions of the Rutgers University School of Environmental and Biological Sciences (formerly Cook College) is located on College Farm Road off Route 1 on the northern end of the township. DeVry University has a campus in North Brunswick on U.S. Route 1 between Milltown Road and Ryders Lane. Chamberlain College of Nursing's administrative offices are located on the DeVry University site. Anthem Institute had a branch on Route 1 on the Technology Centre of New Jersey campus that closed in 2014 as part of a group of closures nationwide.

Transportation

Roads and highways

Major roads in North Brunswick include:

 U.S. Route 130, which begins at an intersection with Route 171's terminus.
 U.S. Route 1, the largest highway in North Brunswick.
 Route 26, also known as Livingston Avenue.
 Route 27, along the western border.
 Route 91, also known as Jersey Avenue.
 Route 171, which starts at the northern terminus of Route 130 as Georges Road in the Berdines Corner section of township and enters New Brunswick.
 County Route 682, also known as Finnegans Lane, a  along the southern border.
 County Route 680, also known as How Lane
 County Route 620, concurrent with Nassau Street east of Georges Road/Route 171.
 County Route 608, in two sections known as Cozzens Lane and Adams Lane.
 County Route 606, also known as Milltown Road.

Limited access roads are accessible outside the township, such as Interstate 287 in bordering Franklin Township. The New Jersey Turnpike (Interstate 95) is accessible from exits in East Brunswick and South Brunswick.

Public transportation
NJ Transit Rail Operations (NJT) originates trains to Penn Station in Midtown Manhattan during peak hours from the Jersey Avenue station in New Brunswick. A new North Brunswick station on its Northeast Corridor Line has been proposed for the former Johnson & Johnson site on Route 1 and Aaron Road. In January 2013 NJT announced that the station would be built in 2018 in conjunction with the transit-oriented development. In addition to the new station the agency plans to build a flyover (balloon loop and flying junction) called the Mid-Line Loop south of the new station allowing trains turn around and enter and leave the Northeast Corridor without crossing over tracks. The new Mid-Line Loop would be in the location of a current minor Amtrak yard, Adams Yard, which is part of the larger County Yard complex.

NJ Transit provides local bus service on the 811 and 814 routes.

Middlesex County Area Transit (MCAT) shuttles provide service on routes operating across the county, including the M1 route, which operates between Jamesburg and the New Brunswick train station and the M5 Jersey Avenue/Brunswick-Commercial Avenue Shuttle.

Suburban Trails offers service to and from New York City on Route 100 between Princeton and the Port Authority Bus Terminal; and Route 600 between East Windsor and Wall Street in Downtown Manhattan.

The Raritan River Railroad ran through North Brunswick, but is now defunct along this part of the line. Proposals have been made to use the line as a light rail route.

Community
There are various communities within North Brunswick. One of many is the Italian American community. The Italian American community of North Brunswick and other Middlesex County towns celebrate their heritage annually at Carnevale Italiano, a decades-old carnival organized by the Italian-American Social Club. This event has been a huge part of North Brunswick's culture, as Middlesex County ranks fourth out of New Jersey's 21 counties in its population of Italian Americans. A highlight of the carnival is a fireworks show by Grucci.

Each year, the sports associations of the township host the North Brunswick Youth Sports Festival. The Heritage Day Committee which consists of Township residents (appointed by the Mayor of North Brunswick) and Liaisons from the Department of Parks, Recreation and Community Services (DPRCS)  hosts a Heritage Day Event each year in North Brunswick Community Park. This festival showcases the many cultures that make up North Brunswick.

Notable people

People who were born in, residents of, or otherwise closely associated with North Brunswick include:

 James Altucher (born 1968), hedge-fund manager, author, podcaster and entrepreneur
 Glen Burtnik (born 1955), songwriter, recording artist and performer who is a former member of the band Styx
 Sean Cameron (born 1985), footballer who most recently played for Miami FC in the USSF Division 2 Professional League
 John Forté (born 1975), music producer for the rap group the Fugees
 Joanna Gregory-Scocchi (born 1959), former member of the New Jersey General Assembly
 Mel Harris (born 1956), actress, known for her role on TV's thirtysomething
 Tim Howard (born 1979), a.k.a. "The Secretary of Defense," goalkeeper for the United States men's national soccer team and for Colorado Rapids in the Major League Soccer
 Ron Howden (born 1945), drummer of 1970s British band Nektar
 Jim Norton (born 1968), comedian and actor
 Aries Spears (born 1975), comedian, actor, performer on Fox's MADtv
 Tiquan Underwood (born 1987), wide receiver who has played in the NFL

References

External links

 North Brunswick Township website
 North Brunswick Township Public Schools
 
 Data for the North Brunswick Township Public Schools, National Center for Education Statistics
 North Brunswick Sentinel community newspaper
 North Brunswick Taxi Service
 North Brunswick Public Library

 
1779 establishments in New Jersey
Faulkner Act (mayor–council–administrator)
Populated places established in 1779
Townships in Middlesex County, New Jersey